Paul Wood is an English former professional rugby league footballer who played as a  and  forward in the 1990s, 2000s and 2010s. He played for the Warrington Wolves in the Super League, and Featherstone Rovers and the Swinton Lions in the Championship. He also played for England and was selected for Great Britain at international level.

Wood played in the 2010 Challenge Cup Final victory over the Leeds Rhinos at Wembley Stadium.

Wood also played in the 2012 challenge cup victory also vs Leeds Rhinos 

Paul Wood has continued to feature for Warrington during 2011 but his season ended early due to an injury in the lower back. During his long career at Warrington he has gained a reputation for the hard yards going forward, work rate & offloading.

He played in the 2012 Challenge Cup Final victory over the Leeds Rhinos at Wembley Stadium.

He played in the 2012 Super League Grand Final defeat by the Leeds Rhinos at Old Trafford During the game Wood ruptured his right testicle after getting kneed in the groin, one minute into the second half. He continued to play, made a number of tackles and even conducted media interviews in the dressing room after the match without mentioning it. It became public knowledge only when he tweeted a couple of hours later that he was heading for hospital for surgery and he confirmed early on Sunday morning that his right testicle had been removed.

He played in the 2013 Super League Grand Final defeat by the Wigan Warriors at Old Trafford.

References

External links
Leigh Centurions profile
(archived by web.archive.org) Player Profile Paul Wood player profile
BBC Article  Keeping the faith
BBC Article  Wood named in GB squad

1981 births
Living people
England national rugby league team players
English rugby league players
Featherstone Rovers players
Rugby league locks
Rugby league props
Rugby league second-rows
Rugby league players from Wigan
Swinton Lions players
Warrington Wolves players